Charge(s) (literal: rank(s)) used to be the generic term to the military ranks above the rank group of enlisted personnel in German speaking armies. In the today’s Austrian Armed Forces (Österreichisches Bundesheer) it is the designation to the rank group OR2 to OR4, which comprises the ranks Gefreiter, Korporal and Zugsführer.

In English speaking armed forces, however, charge characterizes a particular manoeuvre, where soldiers rush towards the enemy to engage in close combat.

Charges in the Austrian Bundesheer

The sequence of rank groups (top-down approach) in the Austrian Bundesheer is as follows:
Personen ohne Chargengrad OR-1 (= Persons without charge grade)
Chargen OR2-OR4 (= Charges)
Unteroffiziere OR5-OR6 (= NCOs)
Stabsunteroffiziere OR7-OR9 (= Staff NCOs)
Offiziere OF1-OF5 (= Officers)
Generale OF6-OF9 (= General officers)

See also

References

External links 
 Bundesheer ranks (in German)

Military ranks of Austria